Thomas Joseph McKinley (19 March 1888 – 8 July 1949) was an Australian politician.

He was born in Maryborough in Victoria. In 1941 he was elected to the Tasmanian House of Assembly as a Labor member for Franklin. He held the seat until his defeat in 1946. McKinley died in Hobart in 1949.

References

1888 births
1949 deaths
Members of the Tasmanian House of Assembly
Australian Labor Party members of the Parliament of Tasmania
20th-century Australian politicians